Line 200 is one of CFR's main lines in Romania having a total length of  and passing through important cities like Alba Iulia, Arad, Brașov, Deva, Hunedoara, Râmnicu Vâlcea, Sibiu, Târgu Jiu and Timișoara.

Secondary lines

References

Railway lines in Romania
Standard gauge railways in Romania